Robert de Longe (Brussels, 1646 – Piacenza, 1709) was a painter born in present-day Belgium, but active in Northern Italy including Cremona and Piacenza.

Biography
He is one of many painters known in Italy as il Fiammingo (the Flemish). De Longe had traveled throughout Italy. In 1680, in Rome he joined painter in the Papal court, and there met Agostino Bonisoli, who brought him to work for many years in Cremona. In 1685, de Longe was invited by the bishop of Piacenza, Giorgio Barni, to work in that city. While a Flemish influence in his work is noticeable, during his stay in Italy, he was influenced by works of Sebastiano Ricci and Giovanni Evangelista Draghi, such as their ''Fasti paintings in the Palazzo Farnese in Piacenza. He is said to have influenced “Cavalier Tempesta”.
One of his masterworks is considered the cupola (1705) of the Oratory of San Giovanni in Cortemaggiore.

References

External links

1646 births
1709 deaths
Artists from Brussels
17th-century Italian painters
Italian male painters
18th-century Italian painters
Italian Baroque painters
Flemish Baroque painters
18th-century Italian male artists